Carex hildebrandtiana is a tussock-forming species of perennial sedge in the family Cyperaceae. It is native to central parts of Madagascar. The plant is listed as a Vulnerable species according to the International Union for Conservation of Nature.

The species was first formally described by the botanist Johann Otto Boeckeler in 1884 as a part of the work Botanische Jahrbücher für Systematik, Pflanzengeschichte und Pflanzengeographie. The type specimen was collected in 1881 near Betsiléeo by Johann Maria Hildebrandt.

See also
List of Carex species

References

hildebrandtiana
Taxa named by Johann Otto Boeckeler
Plants described in 1884
Flora of Madagascar